Sir George Thomas Beilby  (17 November 1850 – 1 August 1924) was a British chemist.

Early life and education
He was born in Edinburgh, the son of a doctor and educated at Edinburgh Academy and Edinburgh University.

Career
In 1869, he joined the Oakbank Oil Company to work in the oil shale industry where he and colleague William Young were able to increase the yield of oil, ammonia, and other useful materials from the shale by retorting and fractional distillation improvements. Their Young and Beilby patent retort was patented in 1882.

In 1892, Beilby patented a production method for hydrogen cyanide. This new method used ammonia and coal as starting materials and was able to meet the rising demands on sodium cyanide for the gold leaching by the MacArthur-Forrest process. He became director of the profitable Cassel Cyanide Company and then became a director of the Castner-Kellner Company at Runcorn, for whom he developed their new Wallsend factory.

Organisational affiliations and honours
He was elected a Fellow of the Royal Society in May 1906. His candidacy citation read:

He was president of the Society of Chemical Industry in 1899, of the chemical section of the British Association in 1905, of the Institute of Chemistry in 1909–12, and of the Institute of Metals in 1916–8. In 1912 he was a member of the Royal Commission on Fuel and Engines for the Navy. During World War I, he was a member of the Admiralty Board of Invention and Research. He joined the Society for Psychical Research in 1914. He was knighted in the 1916 Birthday Honours.

Personal life and death
In 1877, he married Emma Clarke Newnham, usually referred to as Lady Bielby, who was a great supporter of women's organisations, particularly in practical ways behind the scenes. They had a son Hubert and a daughter, Winifred Moller Beilby (1885-1936) who worked with, published with and in 1908 married chemist Frederick Soddy. Beilby supported some of his son in law's research work at the University of Glasgow.

He died in Hampstead, London, in 1924.

Commemoration 
The Beilby Medal and Prize is named in his honour. It is awarded in rotation by the Institute of Materials, Minerals and Mining, the Royal Society of Chemistry and the Society of Chemical Industry.

References

Cyanide patent

External links
 

1850 births
1924 deaths
Parapsychologists
Scientists from Edinburgh
Fellows of the Royal Society
Scottish chemists
People educated at Edinburgh Academy
Alumni of the University of Edinburgh